Juszkiewicz is a Polish-language surname. It has variants in other languages, such as Yushkevich.

People 
Henry Juszkiewicz (born 1953), American chief executive
Łukasz Juszkiewicz (born 1983), Polish footballer
Roman Juszkiewicz (1952–2012), Polish astrophysicist
Ewa Juszkiewicz (born 1984), painter

Polish-language surnames